Stansbury may refer to:

Places
 Stansbury, South Australia
 Stansbury Park, Utah, United States
 Stansbury Island, adjacent in south Great Salt Lake
 Stansbury Mountains, adjacent, south of Stansbury Island
 Stansbury Peninsula, in the South Shetland Islands

Other uses
 Fort Stansbury, early 19th century, south of modern Tallahassee, Florida
 Stansbury (surname)
 Stansbury Hall (West Virginia University), a former building on the Downtown Campus of West Virginia University
 Stansbury High School, Stansbury Park, Utah
 Stansbury House (disambiguation)
 Stansbury v. California (1994), a U.S. Supreme Court case dealing with Miranda warnings
 USS Stansbury (DD-180), named after John Stansbury